Javier "Javi" Pérez Mateo (born 14 August 1995) is a Spanish footballer who plays for UD Ibiza as a central midfielder.

Club career
Born in Cabanillas del Campo, Guadalajara, Castile-La Mancha, Pérez was a CD Guadalajara youth graduate. After making his senior debut with the reserves, he made his first team debut on 8 December 2013, coming on as a late substitute for Álvaro Zazo in a 4–0 Segunda División B home routing of CP Cacereño.

On 11 July 2014, Pérez extended his contract until 2017. He was an ever-present figure during the season, as his side missed out promotion in the play-offs.

On 15 July 2015, Pérez signed a three-year contract with UD Almería, being initially assigned to the B-team also in the third level. On 31 August 2017 he moved to another reserve team, Real Valladolid B in the same division.

On 6 June 2018, Pérez renewed his contract with Valladolid until 2019. The following day, he made his first team debut by coming on as a late substitute for Anuar Tuhami in a 3–1 home win against Sporting de Gijón, in the Segunda División play-offs.

On 10 August 2019, Pérez signed for UD Ibiza still in division three, and was a regular starter as his side achieved a first-ever promotion to the second level in 2021. He terminated his contract with the club on 29 August 2022, and joined Burgos CF in the second level the following day.

References

External links

1995 births
Living people
Sportspeople from the Province of Guadalajara
Spanish footballers
Footballers from Castilla–La Mancha
Association football midfielders
Segunda División players
Segunda División B players
Tercera División players
CD Guadalajara (Spain) footballers
UD Almería B players
UD Almería players
Real Valladolid Promesas players
Real Valladolid players
UD Ibiza players
Burgos CF footballers